Helena is a 1970 song by Flemish kleinkunst singer Hugo Raspoet. It's considered his signature song and his most famous song, alongside Evviva Il Papa. In 2012 the song was inaugurated in Radio 2's De Eregalerij, a gallery for best Dutch-language songs.

Lyrics
Helena is a reflection of a man on his female partner. He observes that they love one another, but that their personalities are just too different to continue their relationship. Raspoet was inspired by his own past  relationships and named the song after Helen of Troy, since she was the archetype of all women. He wrote five years on the song.

Cover versions

Helena has been covered by Mama's Jasje in 1997 and by Kries Roosse in 2003. In 2006 Helena was covered by Rocco Granata.

Sources

Belgian folk songs
Belgian pop songs
1970 songs
Dutch-language Belgian songs
Songs about heartache